Tagore is a 2003 Indian Telugu-language action film directed by V. V. Vinayak. The film stars Chiranjeevi, Shriya and Jyothika in lead role alongside Prakash Raj in other supporting role. It is a remake of the 2002 Tamil film Ramanaa. The film has music by Mani Sharma with cinematography by Chota K. Naidu. It was screened at the International Indian Film Academy Awards, along with Pokiri. Fourteen years later, it was dubbed in Hindi as Gabbar Sher 2.

Plot
The film is about a common man who decides to abolish corruption altogether in the society at various levels.

Fifteen Tahsildars are found missing, and the police find that fourteen of them have been released after three days, but one of them has been killed. They find some files and a tape along with the body of the dead Tahsildar. These files carry details of why the kidnapping of the Tahsildars had been done and the reason for the murder of one of them, and have the words A.C.F. written on it. It is understood by the police that these men were the Tahsildars who had indulged themselves in bribery and that they were the top 15 of the list of the corrupt Tahsildars. The A.C.F. sends the tape, with the message that they shall continue the kidnap of the corrupt officers in all the departments and that the No. 1 corrupt shall be sentenced to death according to the law of the Anti Corruption Force. The A.C.F. similarly kidnaps officials from PWD and police department and kills the top corrupt official.

There is fear among the corrupt officials. They come forward to file their returns. For a while there are no illegal transactions done, but the corruption soon continues in the society due to the threatening of the local mob to sign illegal documents and accept bribes. Meanwhile, the A.C.F. finds that it is Badrinarayana who is the real reason behind this corruption scenario. Then the kidnapping continues. The case is investigated by group of several old-aged senior level officials who are very slow-moving in their progress. However, Suryam, an IPS-passed guy who is working as a constable (as unable to pay the bribe to get the officer-level job), takes up the case in order to get promotion in the department and moves ahead of those officials in a short time, taking a medical leave. He investigates the case starting with finding of the non-corrupt official in every government office, assuming that official would have collected the information of other corrupt officers and passed it to A.C.F.. He tries to figure out what is the common thing which unites them under one roof. He gradually finds out that they are alumni of National College and working for the A.C.F. under their professor and the leader of the A.C.F., Professor Tagore.

Tagore is a simple man who leads a simple life during the daytime along with his adopted kids from different cultures (one is a Muslim, one is an American, and two of the kids are Hindu, etc.). He looks like a timid character, but brave in terms of his actions and he loved by all his peers. Tagore once takes one of his kids to the hospital for treating an injury and finds that the hospital is a place full of corruption who play with the lives of people for the sake of money. Tagore decides to expose the truth and catches them red-handed by faking a dead body as a patient. The hospital, unaware of his plans, continue their treatment even though they know that the person is dead and demand lakhs of money for treatment. Tagore produces the documents and receipts related to their fake treatment and gets the hospital sealed by the government. The hospital dean is arrested, but he commits suicide. Badrinarayana, the dean's father, is enraged by this and attempts to take revenge on Tagore. He finds Tagore in the CCTV camera and is shocked as according to him he was dead several years ago.

Tagore is a happy professor who lives with his wife Nandini, who is expecting a second child and son. On a Deepavali day, when the whole apartment is celebrating the festival, the entire building collapses due to some fault in the construction of a nearby highway, and many of the residents (including Tagore's uncle, Nandini and Tagore's son) lose their lives. Tagore rushes to the government officials, and he learns that all this was due to Badrinarayana, the owner of a construction company and builder of that highway. Tagore finds that the highway was constructed on loose soil by which the contractions caused to collapse was very well known to him. Badrinarayana and his men thrash Tagore, but Tagore escapes from them. The incidents that he faced at the office and seeing corrupt puppets in the hands of Badrinarayana, he becomes frustrated and he forms the A.C.F. (Anti Corruption Force) to fight against corruption. He also kidnaps Badrinarayana and keeps him under his custody.

The constable finally finds out the people working for A.C.F. are the ex-students, and the police force captures all of them. Police men torture them to open the identity of their leader; however, they refuse to do so. Tagore, on seeing his students suffer after Badrinarayana escapes from their custody and kills them, surrenders to the Police and requests the Police to release his students. The rising support for Tagore makes the Chief Minister to meet him for higher appeal. Tagore refuses to appeal as he wants to stress the concept in the minds of everyone that if we make mistakes, we will be punished, and he himself doesn't want to violate it as he did a crime of killing four people. Tagore gives a speech in the court explaining what a student power the country has, but corruption is what is letting it down, also revealing that how he killed Badrinarayana and his brother at the gallows section in the jail. In the end, Tagore is given a normal punishment of five years and is to be released by then.

Cast

 Chiranjeevi as Ravindranath Tagore, professor of National College
 Shriya as Devaki
 Jyothika as Nandini aka Nandhu, Tagore's wife
 Prakash Raj as Suryam (Constable)
 Sayaji Shinde as Badrinarayana
 Puneet Issar as Police Commissioner Balbir Singh
 Sunil as Boost, a babysitter who always gets insulted by the kids fostered by Tagore
 K. Vishwanath as Chief Minister
 Rama Prabha as Tagore's grandmother
 M. S. Narayana as Tagore's uncle
 Ahuti Prasad as Public Prosecutor Subba Rao
 Raja Ravindra as Badrinarayana's son
 Uttej as Auto Driver
 Sarika Ramachandra Rao as Suryam's colleague
 Narsing Yadav as Goon
 Kota Srinivasa Rao
 Venu Madhav as the clerk of a random officer(cameo)
 Dharmavarapu Subrahmanyam as an officer in a department
 Jeeva
 Jenny
 Sameer Hasan
 Subbaraya Sharma
 Master Sajja Teja
 C. V. L. Narasimha Rao
 V. V. Vinayak as Gopi (cameo)
 FEFSI Vijayan as Jailor (cameo appearance in pre climax fight)
 Ravichandran as Judge (cameo appearance in pre climax fight)

Soundtrack

Release and reception
Sify rated the film 3.5 and wrote, "Though the story line is thin, the narration is fast paced and the film is technically excellent." Jeevi of Idlebrain.com rated the film 3.75/5 and appreciated the performances, stating, "Chiranjeevi is at his best, be it in histrionics or looks." On screenplay, he added that "Vinayak made sure that the screenplay is gripping enough to tell a simple story in a powerful way."

Awards and nominations

References

External links
 

2003 films
2000s Telugu-language films
Indian vigilante films
2000s vigilante films
2000s crime drama films
Films about corruption in India
Telugu remakes of Tamil films
Indian films about revenge
Films directed by V. V. Vinayak
Films scored by Mani Sharma
Indian crime drama films
2003 drama films